Luigi Rizzi (born June 11, 1907 in Milan) was an Italian professional football player.

Honours
 Serie A champion: 1929/30.

1907 births
Year of death missing
Italian footballers
Serie A players
Inter Milan players
Parma Calcio 1913 players
Calcio Lecco 1912 players
Association football midfielders